The Army Medical Museum and Library (AMML) of the U.S. Army was a large brick building constructed in 1887 at South B Street (now Independence Avenue) and 7th Street, SW, Washington, D.C., which is directly on the National Mall. It was designated a National Historic Landmark in 1965 and added to the National Register of Historic Places in 1966.  The building was demolished in 1969, and the collections at the focus of the landmark designation were dispersed.

Building history
The AMML was designed by German-born architect Adolf Cluss (1825–1905) to house the Army Medical Museum, the Library of the Surgeon General's Office (later called the Army Medical Library), and some of the Army's medical records.  Between 1893 and 1910, it also housed the Army Medical School.

The AMML remained on the Mall until the 1960s, when the Museum and Library were moved to their present separate locations. The old building (known affectionately as "Old Red" or "The Old Pickle Factory") was razed and replaced by the Smithsonian's Hirshhorn Museum and Sculpture Garden in 1969.

Collection history
The AMML collection had its origins in the federal government's decision in 1862, during the American Civil War, to begin a collection of items of medical and surgical interest related to the treatment of Union Army wounded and sick in the war.  At first focused on diseases related to the military (a major cause of death and incapacity during that war), it grew over the next two decades to include a wider array of samples for the use of military medical investigators.  In 1888 the collection was formally opened to civilian medical researchers as well.

The collection resided in a variety of buildings prior to the construction of the AMML building in 1887, including Ford's Theatre.  It remained in the AMML building until October 1968, at which point it was dispersed.  Its principal successor is the National Museum of Health and Medicine in Silver Spring, Maryland.

Successor institutions
 The Armed Forces Institute of Pathology (AFIP) was located on the campus of Walter Reed Army Medical Center from February 1955 until its disestablishment on May 15, 2011 
 The National Museum of Health and Medicine, located in Forest Glen Annex of Fort Detrick Silver Spring, Maryland beginning September 15, 2011.  It is now part of the U.S. Army Medical Research and Materiel Command.
 The Library of Surgeon General's Office, after various name changes (Army Medical Library, Armed Forces Medical Library) became the National Library of Medicine (NLM) – then a part of the U.S. Public Health Service – in 1956. The NLM moved to the National Institutes of Health campus in Bethesda, Maryland in 1961.

See also
United States Army Medical Department Museum
National Museum of the United States Army#Other Army museums
List of National Historic Landmarks in Maryland
National Register of Historic Places listings in Montgomery County, Maryland

References

External links

 Photograph of "Old Red" on the National Mall
 

Government buildings completed in 1887
Library buildings completed in 1887
Medical Museum and Library
United States Army Medical Museum
Medical Museum and Library
Medical museums in the United States
Libraries on the National Register of Historic Places in Washington, D.C.
Military facilities on the National Register of Historic Places in Washington, D.C.
Defunct museums in Washington, D.C.
National Mall
Military facilities in Washington, D.C.
Educational institutions established in 1887
Southwest Federal Center
1887 establishments in Washington, D.C.
Buildings and structures demolished in 1969